The 13th Legislative Assembly of Himachal Pradesh was formed following the 2017 Assembly election for all 68 seats in the unicameral legislature. The term of 13th Assembly will expire in December 2022. 2022 Himachal Pradesh Legislative Assembly election will be conducted to form the next Himachal Pradesh Assembly.

Office bearers

Members of the Assembly (2017-2022) 

‡ Indicates sitting member who died in office.

References 

Himachal Pradesh
Himachal Pradesh Legislative Assembly